Birtley is a hamlet in north Herefordshire, in England. It is part of the civil parish of Lingen.

References

External links

Hamlets in Herefordshire